"You Better Pray" is a song by American rock band The Red Jumpsuit Apparatus. The song is also available as a downloadable track on the iPhone application Tap Tap Revenge 2. It is a playable track on the Nintendo DS version of Band Hero.

Charts

2008 singles
2008 songs
The Red Jumpsuit Apparatus songs
Virgin Records singles
Music videos directed by Tony Petrossian